Mroczki-Kawki is a village in the administrative district of Gmina Rzewnie, within Maków County, Masovian Voivodeship, in east-central Poland.

From 1975-1998 the town was administered as a part of Ostrołęka County.

References

Mroczki-Kawki